Ash-Shʿubah is a sub-district located in the Al-Ma'afer District, Taiz Governorate, Yemen. Ash-Shʿubah had a population of 23,720 according to the 2004 census.

References  

Sub-districts in Al-Ma'afer District